The 2022 Sunoco Go Rewards 200 at The Glen was the 22nd stock car race of the 2022 NASCAR Xfinity Series, and the 28th iteration of the event. The race was held on Saturday, August 20, 2022, in Watkins Glen, New York at Watkins Glen International, a  permanent road course. The race took the scheduled 82 laps to complete. After Ty Gibbs and William Byron spun for the lead with 5 laps to go, Kyle Larson, driving for JR Motorsports, took over the lead and held off A. J. Allmendinger for his 13th career NASCAR Xfinity Series win, and his first of the season. Byron and Gibbs had dominated the race, leading 35 and 25 laps. To fill out the podium, Sammy Smith, driving for Joe Gibbs Racing, would finish 3rd, respectively.

This was the debut race for Brad Perez. Austin Wayne Self was also scheduled to make his debut in this race, but had failed to qualify.

Background 
Watkins Glen International, nicknamed "The Glen", is an automobile race track located in the town of Dix just southwest of the village of Watkins Glen, New York, at the southern tip of Seneca Lake. It was long known around the world as the home of the Formula One United States Grand Prix, which it hosted for twenty consecutive years (1961–1980). In addition, the site has also been home to road racing of nearly every class, including the World Sportscar Championship, Trans-Am, Can-Am, NASCAR Cup Series, the International Motor Sports Association and the IndyCar Series. The facility is currently owned by NASCAR.

Entry list 

 (R) denotes rookie driver.
 (i) denotes driver who are ineligible for series driver points.

Practice 
The only 30-minute practice session was held on Saturday, August 20, at 10:00 AM EST.

Qualifying 
Qualifying was held on Saturday, August 20, at 10:30 AM EST. Since Watkins Glen International is a road course, the qualifying system used is a two group system, with two rounds. Drivers will be separated into two groups, Group A and Group B. The fastest 5 drivers from each group will advance to the final round. Drivers will also have multiple laps to set a time. The fastest driver to set a time in the round will win the pole. With that lap, Byron also broke the track record.

Race results 
Stage 1 Laps: 20

Stage 2 Laps: 20

Stage 3 Laps: 42

Standings after the race 

Drivers' Championship standings

Note: Only the first 12 positions are included for the driver standings.

References 

2022 NASCAR Xfinity Series
NASCAR races at Watkins Glen International
NASCAR Xfinity Series Race at Watkins Glen
2022 in sports in New York (state)